Rebecca Mbithi, is a lawyer, accountant and corporate executive in Kenya, the largest economy in the East African Community. She is the managing director and chief executive officer (CEO) of Family Bank, a financial service provider with assets valued at about US$696 million, as of 31 December 2017. She was appointed to that position in February 2019.

Background and education
She was born in Kenya. After attending local primary and secondary schools, she was admitted to the University of Nairobi, Kenya's oldest public university, where she graduated with a Bachelor of Laws degree. She went on to enroll in the Advocate Training Program at the Kenya School  of Law. Following the successful completion of that training, she was admitted to the Kenyan Bar.

Her second degree is a Master of Business Administration in Strategic Management, awarded by the United States International University Africa, in Nairobi, Kenya's capital city. She is also a Certified Public Accountant, and a Certified Public Secretary.

Career
Before she joined Family Bank, Mbithi worked at Kenya Tea Development Agencies (KTDA) and at Rift Valley Railways. At the time she was appointed CEO, she was the Company Secretary and Director of Legal Services at Family Bank, a position she had held since 2015. Her appointment as Managing Director of Family Bank is subject to approval by the Central Bank of Kenya, the county's central bank and national banking regulator. She replaces David Thuku, who resigned from the bank in September 2018, to pursue personal interests. He stayed on at the bank while a replacement was being recruited. In October 2019, the Central Bank of Kenya approved the appointment of Rebecca Mbithi as the chief executive of Family Bank.

Other considerations
Rebecca Mbithi is an Advocate of the High Court of Kenya and a member of the Law Society of Kenya. She is also a member of the Institute of Certified Public Accountants of Kenya and a Certified Public Secretary. Rebecca  Mbithi is the fifth female CEO in Kenya's commercial banking sector. The other four are (a) Nasim Devji, at Diamond Trust Bank (b) Betty Korir at Credit Bank (c) Anne Karanja, at Kenya Post Office Savings Bank and (d) Joyce Ann Wainaina, at Citibank Kenya.

See also
List of banks in Kenya
Economy of Kenya

References

External links
  Website of Family Bank

Living people
21st-century Kenyan businesswomen
21st-century Kenyan businesspeople
Kikuyu people
Kenyan bankers
Kenyan accountants
United States International University alumni
Year of birth missing (living people)
People from Nairobi
Kenyan chief executives
Women chief executives
Kenyan women business executives
University of Nairobi alumni